Snowfall in Israel is uncommon, but it occurs in higher parts of the country, the northern part of the country and in Jerusalem. In January and February 1950, Jerusalem and Tel Aviv experienced the largest snowfall registered since the beginning of meteorological measurements in 1870. No accumulation of snow has occurred in the Israeli Mediterranean coastal plain and the Dead Sea since the 1950 snowfalls. Snow is unknown in the vicinity of Eilat, in the southernmost Negev.

History

1950 snowfall 

The snow event began in early January 1950 with  a hailstorm in Tel Aviv and light snow in the mountains of the Upper Galilee and Jerusalem.

On January 27, it began to snow in the northern mountains and Jerusalem. It piled up but quickly melted.  A cold front spread throughout the country and snow began falling in the mountains of Samaria and the West. On the 28th it snowed in Haifa and piled up to a height of 15 cm. Even in Tel Aviv, snow fell for several minutes. On January 29, it snowed again in Haifa,  blanketing most of the city in white.

A week later, on February 6–7, heavy snow began to fall across the country. The depth reached 60 cm in Safed, 
and 100 cm in Jerusalem, and 17 cm in Haifa, and 12 –19 cm in Tel Aviv and Lod; it also snowed in Petah Tikva, Netanya and Samaria, in Rishon Lezion's streets, on the mountains surrounding the Sea of Galilee, and in the Negev. On February 8, the snow also came to the Dead Sea, where 8 cm of snow was reported.

2013 snowfall 

Warmer parts of Israel received heavy rains, causing floods. Although it was the Sabbath, the railway into Jerusalem ran for people stranded by blocked roads.

Roads were closed in Israel by deep snow and flooding. Storm clouds prompted Ben Gurion International Airport to shut down, forcing US Secretary of State John Kerry to cut short his meeting with Palestinian President Mahmoud Abbas in Ramallah to return to Israel before roads and airports were out of service. Jerusalem was cut off for 48 hours by deep snow and flooding, and cars were abandoned after they got stuck in snow.

See also

Climate of Asia
Geography of Israel
Israel Meteorological Service

References

External links 

 Yinon Reichman, big snow year, Ynet, January 11, 2007
 A collection of pictures of the snow event

Israel
Environment of Israel
Israel
Water in Israel
Weather events in Asia
Winter events in Israel